Bhutan competed at the 2017 Asian Indoor and Martial Arts Games held in Ashgabat, Turkmenistan. 12 athletes competed only in 1 sporting event, Taekwondo. Bhutan did not win any medal at the Games.

Participants

References 

Nations at the 2017 Asian Indoor and Martial Arts Games
2017 in Bhutanese sport